Zoo Station, formerly planned to be called "Guangzhou Zoo South Entrance Station", is a station on Line 5 of the Guangzhou Metro. It opened on 28December 2009.

Zoo Station was not in the original plan but was added later, between Ouzhuang Station and Yangji Station after a request by Guangzhou citizens. Due to space limitations it is designed on three levels like Hong Kong MTR stations. The top underground floor is the concourse, below that is the platform for trains towards Wenchong Station and the lowest level is for trains towards Jiaokou Station. It is the first station in Guangzhou Metro system to have this Hong Kong-style multilevel design.

Station layout

Exits

References

Railway stations in China opened in 2009
Guangzhou Metro stations in Yuexiu District